Marili is a 1959 West German romantic comedy film directed by Josef von Báky and starring Sabine Sinjen, Paul Hubschmid and Helmuth Lohner.

It was shot at the Spandau Studios in Berlin and on location at Berchtesgaden in Bavaria. The film's sets were designed by the art directors Albrecht Hennings and Erich Kettelhut. It was made in Eastmancolor.

Cast
 Sabine Sinjen as Marili 
 Paul Hubschmid as Robert Orban 
 Helmuth Lohner as Peter Markwart 
 Hanne Wieder as Ella Roland 
 Ernst Schröder as Waldemar Heller 
 Leonard Steckel as Ludwig Ostertag 
 Ursula Gütschow as Englischlehrerin 
 Käte Jaenicke as Köchin 
 Hilde Schönborn as Schneiderin 
 Erich Dunskus as Bühnenportier 
 Maria Axt as Kesse Dame 
 Helmut Ahner as Mixer 
 Annie Pauker as 1. Tischdame 
 Inge Kühl as 2. Tischdame 
 Rudolf Vogel as Berthold Glubb

See also
 Marika (1938)

References

Bibliography 
 Hans-Michael Bock and Tim Bergfelder. The Concise Cinegraph: An Encyclopedia of German Cinema. Berghahn Books, 2009.

External links 
 

1959 films
1959 romantic comedy films
German romantic comedy films
West German films
1950s German-language films
Films directed by Josef von Báky
Remakes of Hungarian films
Gloria Film films
Films shot at Spandau Studios
1950s German films